The 1999 Big Sky Conference men's basketball tournament was held March 4–6 at the Dee Events Center at Weber State University in Ogden, Utah.

Top-seeded host Weber State defeated defending champion  in the championship game,  to win their sixth Big Sky tournament title.

Format
No new teams were added and membership remained at nine. After completing its transition to Division I, Portland State was eligible for the Big Sky tournament for the first time. 

Similar to the previous year, the top six teams in the regular season conference standings participated in the tournament. The top two earned byes into the semifinals while the remaining four played in the quarterfinals. The lowest remaining seed met the top seed in the semifinals.

Bracket

NCAA tournament
Weber State earned the automatic bid to the NCAA tournament; no other Big Sky members were invited, or to the NIT. Seeded fourteenth in the West regional, the Wildcats upset perennial power North Carolina in the first round in the nightcap in Seattle, which ended after midnight back east. In the second round, Weber State lost in overtime

See also
Big Sky Conference women's basketball tournament

References

Big Sky Conference men's basketball tournament
Tournament
Big Sky Conference men's basketball tournament
Big Sky Conference men's basketball tournament
Basketball competitions in Ogden, Utah
College sports tournaments in Utah